The Werre is a river in the Detmold region (Regierungsbezirk) of North Rhine-Westphalia, Germany, left tributary of the Weser. Its source is near Horn-Bad Meinberg. The Werre flows generally north through the towns Detmold, Lage, Bad Salzuflen, Herford and Löhne. It flows into the Weser close to Bad Oeynhausen. The total length of the Werre is 71.9 km. It crosses the districts of Lippe, Herford and Minden-Lübbecke.

References

 
Rivers of North Rhine-Westphalia
Rivers of Germany